Joe Bush is a legendary ghost that allegedly haunts the Sumpter Valley Gold Dredge in Sumpter, Oregon, United States. According to legend, dredge workers on the No. 42 dredge at Sumpter Valley claim the ghost leaves wet, bare footprints on the dredge's decks, causes lights to flicker, and doors to open and close unexpectedly. The ghost of Joe Bush also makes an appearance in the book series Skeleton Creek.

History 
According to Wes Dickson, an employee of the Sumpter dredge during the 1940s, "it all started as a joke, and I'd blame George Hansen", explaining that Hansen was a fellow employee who spread the legend of Joe Bush. George Hansen said that, "anything that happened on the dredge, or something went wrong, it was Joe Bush".

Popular culture 
In the Skeleton Creek book series, a man named Henry trying to get gold from the dredge pretends to be the ghost of Joe Bush.

See also
List of ghosts
Madam Koi Koi

References

External links
Montana Standard article about the ghost of Joe Bush
Lisa Britton, The Legend of Joe Bush, Baker City Herald, October 31, 2007.
Lisa Britton, Sumpter's Spooky Old Dredge Inspires Author's Ghostly Tale, Baker City Herald, February 10, 2009.

American ghosts
Baker County, Oregon